Heart of Oak is a 2022 French nature documentary film directed by  and Michel Seydoux. It is about an oak tree and the animals that live in it, portrayed without spoken commentary.

Synopsis
It follows the tree and its animal inhabitants during one calendar year. The animals include insects, birds, mice and a red squirrel.

Production
The French companies Camera One and Winds produced Heart of Oak with co-production support from Gaumont. The producers were Barthélémy Fougea and Michel Seydoux. Cinematography was done by Mathieu Giombini, Charbonnier and Samuel Guiton. Sylvie Lager was the editor.

The tree is located close to Charbonnier's home in Sologne and filming took a year and a half. The crew spent around 100 days on lookout at the tree. A chase sequence with a bird of prey, comprising 1 minute and 20 seconds of the finished 80-minute film, was the result of 15 days of work.

Release
Heart of Oak premiered on 13 February 2022 at the 72nd Berlin International Film Festival, where it played in the Berlinale Special section. Gaumont released it in French cinemas on 23 February 2022. The French release was accompanied by explanatory podcasts and educational printed materials.

Reception
Greg Wetherall of Little White Lies likened the filmmaking technique to Viktor Kossakovsky's  (2018) and the films of Dziga Vertov, highlighting Heart of Oaks use of music, humour and portrayal of nature. Wetherall called it "a hypnotic assault on the senses that captures the beauty and might of our natural world". In Le Figaro, Pierre De Boishue likened the tree to a hotel and said the film is reminiscent of Microcosmos (1996). He described it as an "ode to biodiversity" that "exudes superb poetry". Nicolas Schaller of L'Obs also compared it to Microcosmos and said Heart of Oak may educate small children about the cycles of nature, but is repetitive and might bore them instead. He said the animal interactions are "documentary in name only", as they were created through editing or staged. The film was nominated for Best Documentary Film at the 48th César Awards.

References

External links
 Official website 
 

2022 documentary films
French documentary films
Documentary films about animals
Films about trees
Quercus
Films produced by Michel Seydoux